The landforms of Earth are generally divided into physiographic divisions, consisting of physiographic provinces, which in turn consist of physiographic sections, though some others use different terminology, such as realms, regions and subregions. Some areas have further categorized their respective areas into more detailed subsections.

References

Geomorphology
Earth sciences

Geography-related lists